Nimisha Vakharia is an Indian actress, working in Hindi TV shows.

Television

Filmography

References

External links 
 
 

Living people

Year of birth missing (living people)

21st-century Indian actresses

Actresses in Hindi television
Indian television actresses
Indian soap opera actresses
Actresses from Mumbai
Gujarati people